Dissolution  (stylised as di§olution) is the twelfth studio album by British rock band The Pineapple Thief, released on 31 August 2018 through Kscope. It's the second album to include Gavin Harrison on drums, but this is Harrison's first album as an official member of the band.

Track listing

Personnel

The Pineapple Thief
 Bruce Soord – vocals, guitars
 Jon Sykes – bass, backing vocals
 Steve Kitch – keyboards
 Gavin Harrison – drums, percussion

Additional musicians
 David Torn – additional guitars 

Production
 The Pineapple Thief – production
 Bruce Soord – recording, mixing
 Gavin Harrison – recording , mixing 
 Steve Kitch – mastering
 Stylorouge – art direction, design
 Rob O'Connor – photography
 James Usill – post-production
 Frederick Jude – executive producer

Charts

References

2018 albums
The Pineapple Thief albums
Kscope albums